RKI-1447 is a drug which acts as a potent and selective inhibitor of the enzyme Rho kinase, with an IC50 of 14.5 nM at ROCK1 and 6.2 nM at ROCK2. It has been investigated for applications in cancer treatment, as well as glaucoma, and nonalcoholic fatty liver disease.

See also 
 Rho kinase inhibitor

References 

Enzyme inhibitors
Thiazoles
4-Pyridyl compounds
Phenols
Ureas